Tanja Kari is a Finnish Paralympic gold medalist in cross-country skiing. She is an amputee missing a right arm. In 2003, she was nominated for the Laureus World Sports Award for Sportsperson of the Year with a Disability and in 2010 she was inducted into the Paralympic Hall of Fame. He was voted Finland's best disabled athlete in 1998 and 2002. Kari is a member of the WADA Athletes' Committee and the Athletes' Committee of the International Paralympic Committee.

References 

1971 births
Living people
People from Ii
Finnish female cross-country skiers
Paralympic cross-country skiers of Finland
Cross-country skiers at the 1992 Winter Paralympics
Cross-country skiers at the 1994 Winter Paralympics
Cross-country skiers at the 1998 Winter Paralympics
Cross-country skiers at the 2002 Winter Paralympics
Paralympic gold medalists for Finland
Paralympic silver medalists for Finland
Paralympic bronze medalists for Finland
Medalists at the 1992 Winter Paralympics
Medalists at the 1994 Winter Paralympics
Medalists at the 1998 Winter Paralympics
Medalists at the 2002 Winter Paralympics
Medalists at the 1988 Winter Paralympics
Paralympic medalists in cross-country skiing
Sportspeople from North Ostrobothnia
20th-century Finnish women